Julia Tsenova (also spelled Julia Tzenova, Julia Cenova, or Julia Zenova) ( – ), born in Sofia, Bulgaria, was an award-winning Bulgarian composer, pianist and musical pedagogue.

Life and career
Julia Tsenova graduated both Composition and Piano in the State Academy of Music in Sofia as a student of Prof. Pancho Vladigerov. Tsenova took part in the International Composers' class in Sofia and Amsterdam, directed by Prof. Ton de Leeuw - the Netherlands (1981, 1982). She attended many workshops in Europe. Her music was performed in different contemporary festivals, as well as at the International Composers' Rostrum in Paris (1995). Since 1997 she was Professor of Piano and Dean at the Pop and Jazz Music Faculty in the State Academy of Music. She was a member of the Union of the Bulgarian Composers as well as of the International Society for Contemporary Music, and a President of the Bulgarian section. Julia Tsenova died on 11 April 2010.

Her daughter Kristina Sandulova is also a concert pianist.

Music
Julia Tsenova has had versatile musical interests. She wrote in the field of symphonic, chamber, choral and scenic music. Her works are dramatic and rich in dynamics and philosophy. As a composer she owns a bright individual style and perfect use of the modern composition techniques.

Tsenova has always had a strong interest in the ancient eastern philosophies - this interest finds its own secret ways to penetrate in the creative ideas of the composer. Traces of this trend can be found in her latest works as well.

Her compositions have been performed in different musical forums in Bulgaria, Austria, Switzerland, England, Ireland, Germany, France, Italy, Spain, Netherlands, Norway, Poland, Czech Republic, Slovakia, Hungary, Romania, Greece, Russia, India, Australia, United States, Canada and other countries.

Personal life

In 2002 Bulgarian National Television produced a documentary entitled Prayers onto the Wall devoted to Julia Tsenova and her works.

She died of cancer on April 11, 2010, in Sofia, and is buried in Central Sofia Cemetery.

Selected works

Symphonic
1974 Sinfonia con piano concertante
1979 Movement for orchestra
1984 Fest music - for orchestra
1994 Fresco - for chamber choir and orchestra
2000 Suggestion - for orchestra
2001 Shopp Dance

Chamber
1973 Three Indian songs - solo contralto
1975 Seven songs - for soprano and string quintet
1976 Three Frescoes with Epilogue for viola and piano
1981 Step and Rag-Time for viola and piano
1985 Music for the mice - Fl, Cl, Fg
1986 Music in the entr'acte - Pn, Vla, Cb, tape effects
1987 Cantus Firmus a due - Cl, Pn, Marimba
1990 Diving in the poles - for seven voices (4+3)
1993 The water sends me to sleep - Pn, Cl, Vibraphone and sound effects
1995 The endless circle - Pn, String quintet, Fl, Cr
1996 Temptation - Chamber opera - musical
1996 Triptych for Keyboard - Pn
1996 ...Invoking the gods - Altoflute in G + Mexican sistrum, Piano + Mexican drum, Cbass + log drum
1997 Musica solitudinis - Pn
1997 A swan song - for female - voice folk choir
1997 An album of jazz pieces for piano
1998 Shop dance - a piece for piano four handed
1998 = 3.14 - for voice and chamber orchestra
1998 Isida's unveiling - alt saxofone + easy piano, trumpet and audio amplifier and loudspeaker system
1999 Four prayers - Pn
2000 Green silence - Fl, Vla, harp and piano
2001 The seventh door - Fl, Cl, Vno, Vc, Pn
2001 A Song Cycle - for Soprano and Piano /on Ingeborg Bachmann's poetry/
2002 Quantum Satis - for female folk choir, 2 Pn, Gong and cassa
2002 Temple of the Dancers - 3 Fl /1 solo + 2/
2003 Metamorphoses - for piano four handed
2003 String Quartet
2003 Curriculum Vitae - on I. Bachmann for soprano and piano
2004 The Left Dragon - for oboe solo

Further reading
 Tzinandova-Haralampieva, Vesa. Submerging into Poles. Painting a Portrait of Composer Julia Tzenova (Sofia, 2001) .

References

External links

 Julia Tsenova at the Union of Bulgarian Composers
 Julia Tsenova at Duck Duck Go
 . Dedicated to and performed by Kristina Sandulova, live at the Gesellschaft für Musiktheater, Vienna, Austria, 31 March 2004.
 "The endless circle" by Julia Tsenova
 Любомир Денев: "Композитор/ка", Interview with Julia Tsenova, Kultura, 31 July 1998 .
 Julia Tsenova, Im Katalog der Deutschen Nationalbibliothek .

1948 births
2010 deaths
Bulgarian classical musicians
Bulgarian jazz musicians
Experimental musicians
Women classical composers
Bulgarian classical composers
Experimental composers
Bulgarian pianists
Bulgarian music educators
Musicians from Sofia
Deaths from cancer in Bulgaria
Burials at Central Sofia Cemetery
20th-century pianists
Women music educators
Women classical pianists
20th-century women composers
20th-century women pianists